Encephalartos poggei is a species of cycad in the family Zamiaceae. It is referred to by the common name Kananga cycad. It is native to Angola, the Democratic Republic of the Congo and Zaire.

Description
It is a cycad with an erect stem, up to 2 m tall and 20–30 cm in diameter. The leaves, pinnate, 70–150 cm long, are arranged in a crown at the apex of the stem and are supported by a 7-20 cm long petiole, without thorns and covered with a greyish tomentum; each leaf is composed of 18-60 pairs of lanceolate, leathery leaflets, on average 8-15 cm long, of glaucous green color.

It is a dioecious species with male specimens that have 1-3 cones, sub-cylinders, 16–20 cm long and 3–7 cm broad, greenish to orange yellow in color, and female specimens with 1-3 ovoid cones, 17–23 long cm and with a diameter of 9-12 cm, initially green, yellow when ripe.

The seeds are coarsely ovoid, 20–33 mm long, covered with a red-brownish sarcotesta.

Range
It occurs in:
Shaba Province, DRC: near Kasidiji, Kanda-Kanda, and Gonzo
Kasai Occidental, DRC: near Luluaborg
Lunda Sul Province, Angola: near Sombo

References

External links

poggei
Taxa named by Paul Friedrich August Ascherson
Flora of Angola
Flora of the Democratic Republic of the Congo